Juliet Marillier (born 27 July 1948) is a New Zealand-born writer of fantasy, focusing predominantly on historical fantasy.

Biography 

Juliet Marillier was educated at the University of Otago, where she graduated with a BA in languages and a Bachelor of Music (honours). Marillier taught music at the high school and university levels and has also served as a choral conductor and opera singer.

Marillier lives in the Swan Valley, Western Australia (2014).

Marillier serves on the Literary Advisory Committee for the Katherine Susannah Prichard Writers' Centre and is a regular contributor to the fiction writing blog, Writer Unboxed.

Awards

Bibliography

The Sevenwaters Series
 Daughter of the Forest (1999) 
 Son of the Shadows (2000) 
 Child of the Prophecy (2001) 
 Heir to Sevenwaters (2008)
 Seer of Sevenwaters (2010)
 Flame of Sevenwaters (2012)

Saga of the Light Isles
 Wolfskin (2002) 
 Foxmask (2003)

The Bridei Chronicles
 The Dark Mirror (2004)
 Blade of Fortriu (2005) 
 The Well of Shades (2006)

The Whistling Tor series
 Heart's Blood (2009)

Novels for young adults
 Wildwood Dancing (2006) 
 Cybele's Secret (2007)

The Shadowfell series
 Shadowfell (2012)
 Raven Flight (2013)
 The Caller (2014)

Blackthorn and Grim
 Dreamer's Pool (2014)
 Tower of Thorns (2015) 
 Den of Wolves (October, 2016)

Warrior Bards 

 The Harp of Kings (September, 2019)
 A Dance with Fate (September, 2020)
 A Song of Flight (September, 2021)

Short story collections
 Prickle Moon (2013), 16 stories.
Mother Thorn and Other Tales of Courage and Kindness (2021), 4 stories.

Short stories
Short stories in Prickle Moon.
 "Prickle Moon"
 "Otherling"
 "Let down your hair"
 "Poppy seeds"
 "In Coed Celyddon"
 "Juggling silver"
 "'Twixt Firelight and Water (A Tale of Sevenwaters)"
 "Gift of hope"
 "Letters from Robert"
 "Jack's day"
 "Far horizons"
 "Tough Love 3001"
 "Wraith, level one"
 "Back and beyond"
 "The angel of death"
 "By bone-light"
 "Beautiful" 

Dates shown are for first Australian publication.

Audiobooks 

Daughter of the Forest
Son of the Shadows
Child of the Prophecy
Heir to Sevenwaters
Seer of Sevenwaters
Flame of Sevenwaters
Wolfskin
Foxmask
The Dark Mirror
Blade of Fortriu
The Well of Shades
Heart's Blood
Wildwood Dancing
Cybele's Secret
Dreamer's Pool
Tower of Thorns
Den of Wolves
The Harp of Kings
A Dance with Fate
A Song of Flight
Beautiful (novel)
Die Tochter der Wälder (German)
Sohn der Schatten (German)
Das Kind der Stürme (German)
Die Erben von Sevenwaters (German)

References

External links

 
 
 Juliet Marillier at Libraries Australia Authorities with catalogue search 
 

1948 births
New Zealand fantasy writers
New Zealand women writers
Living people
Writers from Dunedin
University of Otago alumni
People educated at Otago Girls' High School
20th-century New Zealand educators